Roshorv is a village in Gorno-Badakhshan Autonomous Region, southeastern Tajikistan. It is part of the jamoat Savnob in Rushon District. It lies on the upper reaches of the river Bartang. 

Roshorv is situated on a plateau and is settled and has cultivated land. In his journey the Pamir Mountains in 1897-98, British agent Ralph Cobbold passed through Roshorv. In his memoirs Cobbold stated that the village had fifty houses.

The population of Roshorv is Tajik and speaks a district dialect of the Rushani language.

References

Populated places in Gorno-Badakhshan